Bulbophyllum chinense is a species of orchid in section Cirrhopetalum.

chinense
Plants described in 1842